Maryon Park is an urban public park located in Charlton in the Royal Borough of Greenwich. It is situated on the A206 south of the Thames Barrier. There is access from Woolwich Road, Charlton Lane and Thorntree Road. It is part of the Maryon Wilson Park and Gilbert's Pit Local Nature Reserve.

History
Charlton sandpits, which were originally part of an area known as Hanging Wood, were presented to the London County Council in 1891 by the Maryon-Wilson family, and one of the pits became Maryon Park. Another pit became Charlton Athletic's football ground, The Valley.

The park was originally wooded and, together with what is now Maryon Wilson Park, was known as Hanging Woods. This was a wild wooded area and formed an ideal retreat for highwaymen who robbed travellers on Shooters Hill and Blackheath. Though it is popularly supposed that the wood was used for hanging those who were caught, a more likely explanation for the name is the wood's location on steep slopes so that the trees appear to hang from the slope. Such woods are often referred to as 'hanging woods' (the word 'hang' comes from the Old English 'hangra', a wooded slope).

The park was opened in 1891, with JJ Sexby, then chief surveyor to LCC's parks department, designing serpentine paths around the slopes of the hill.

Flora
The park contains grassland, with hawkweed, gorse and broom.

Attractions and facilities
The park includes Cox's Mount, which was used by the Romans as a hill fort, which was discovered in 1915. In the 1850s, Cox's Mount was used to help ships on the nearby River Thames adjust their compasses.

The park has hard tennis courts, a basketball court and a children's play area. The Capital Ring walk and the Green Chain Walk both pass through the park.

Nearby attractions
Adjacent to the park to the south is Gilbert's Pit, a Site of Special Scientific Interest. The similarly named Maryon Wilson Park is located south of Gilbert's Pit.

In popular culture
Although it was not identified by name, the park was the filming location of key scenes in Blowup (1966), a drama mystery-thriller film directed by Michelangelo Antonioni and starring David Hemmings, Sarah Miles and Vanessa Redgrave. The park is little changed since the making of the film.

The park also makes an appearance in the rarely seen promotional video for the Stranglers single Walk on By.

References

External links 

Database (undated). "Marion Park". Descriptive page on Maryon Park at greenwich.gov.uk, the Greenwich London Borough Council's official website. Retrieved 22 February 2011.
Greenwich Guide — Charlton's Parks
Friends of Maryon and Maryon Wilson Park
Where Did They Film That? — Location Information

Parks and open spaces in the Royal Borough of Greenwich
Charlton, London
Local nature reserves in Greater London